Joseph Marcel Belliveau (January 29, 1895 – May 29, 1964) was a Canadian professional ice hockey player. In 1913-14, he played with the Halifax Crescents of the Maritime Professional Hockey Association, scoring 21 goals in 24 games.

He played left wing for one game with the Montreal Canadiens of the National Hockey Association in 1914-15.  After being released by the Canadiens he returned east and played with the Sydney Millionaires of the Eastern Professional Hockey League.

In 1915, he joined the Canadian army in Europe and was severely wounded in the battle of the Somme.  After the war he settled in Dorchester, New Brunswick.  He coached the Dorchester college team to provincial championships in 1927 and 1928.

References

1895 births
1964 deaths
Canadian ice hockey left wingers
Ice hockey people from New Brunswick
Montreal Canadiens (NHA) players
Sportspeople from Moncton